On July 2, 1982, Larry Walters (April 19, 1949 – October 6, 1993) made a 45-minute flight in a homemade aerostat made of an ordinary patio chair and 45 helium-filled weather balloons. During the landing, the aircraft became entangled in power lines, but Walters was able to climb down safely. The flight attracted worldwide media attention and inspired a movie and numerous imitators.

Background
Al Mingalone, an American photographer for Paramount News had in 1937 previously used 32 weather balloons for a feature photography assignment at Old Orchard Beach in Maine. While he hung suspended from the balloons by a parachute harness in order to take aerial film footage, Mingalone's mooring rope broke and he was lifted approximately  into the air.

Lawrence Richard "Larry" Walters had often dreamed of flying, but was unable to become a pilot in the United States Air Force because of his poor eyesight. He first thought of using weather balloons to fly at age 13, after seeing them hanging from the ceiling of a military surplus store. He had a career as a truck driver.

In 1982, he decided to try his flying idea. His intention was to float over the Mojave Desert and then use a pellet gun to burst some of the balloons in order to land.

Preparation and flight
In mid-1982, Walters and his girlfriend at the time, Carol Van Deusen, purchased 45  weather balloons and obtained helium tanks from California Toy Time Balloons. They used a forged requisition from his employer, FilmFair Studios, saying the balloons were for a television commercial.

On July 2, 1982, Walters attached 43 of the balloons to his lawn chair, filled them with helium, put on a parachute, and strapped himself into the chair in the backyard of a home at 1633 West 7th Street in San Pedro. He took his pellet gun, a CB radio, sandwiches, beer, and a camera. He slowly drifted over Long Beach and crossed the primary approach corridor of Long Beach Airport.

He was in contact with REACT, a citizens band radio monitoring organization, who recorded their conversation:

REACT: What information do you wish me to tell [the airport] at this time as to your location and your difficulty?
Larry: Ah, the difficulty is, ah, this was an unauthorized balloon launch, and, uh, I know I'm in a federal airspace, and, uh, I'm sure my ground crew has alerted the proper authority. But, uh, just call them and tell them I'm okay.

After 45 minutes in the sky, Walters shot several balloons, taking care not to unbalance the load. He then accidentally dropped his pellet gun overboard. He descended slowly, until the balloons' dangling cables got caught in a power line at 423 E 44th Way in Long Beach. The power line broke, causing a 20-minute electricity blackout. He landed unharmed on the ground.

Aftermath
Walters was immediately arrested by waiting members of the Long Beach Police Department. Regional safety inspector Neal Savoy was reported to have said, "We know he broke some part of the Federal Aviation Act, and as soon as we decide which part it is, some type of charge will be filed. If he had a pilot's license, we'd suspend that, but he doesn't."  Walters initially was fined $4,000 for violations under U.S. Federal Aviation Regulations, including operating an aircraft within an airport traffic area "without establishing and maintaining two-way communications with the control tower."  Walters appealed, and the fine was reduced to $1,500.  A charge of operating a "civil aircraft for which there is not currently in effect an airworthiness certificate" was dropped, as it was not applicable to his class of aircraft.

Just after landing, Walters spoke to the press, saying:

The aircraft was dubbed Inspiration I. Lawn Chair Larry was awarded the title of "At-Risk Survivor" in the 1993 Darwin Awards.

Ten days after his flight, Walters appeared on Late Night with David Letterman. He was briefly in demand as a motivational speaker, and quit his job as a truck driver. He was featured in a Timex print ad in the early 1990s, but never made much money from his fame.

The lawn chair used in the flight was reportedly given to an admiring boy named Jerry, though Walters regretted doing so when the Smithsonian Institution asked him to donate it to its museum. Twenty years later, Jerry sent an email to Mark Barry, a pilot who had documented Walters's story and dedicated a website to it, and identified himself.  The chair was still sitting in his garage, attached to some of the original tethers and water jugs used as ballast. The chair was placed on loan to the San Diego Air and Space Museum, where it was exhibited in 2014. It was later donated to the Smithsonian and is on display at the newly renovated National Air and Space Museum in Washington.

Later life and death
Later in his life, Walters hiked the San Gabriel Mountains and did volunteer work for the United States Forest Service. He later broke up with his girlfriend of 15 years and could only find work sporadically as a security guard. On October 6, 1993, at the age of 44, Walters died by suicide after shooting himself in the heart in Angeles National Forest.

Imitators
Walters's flight spawned imitators, and allegedly inspired the extreme sport of cluster ballooning.
He was cited with four violations of FAA regulations and fined $4,000.
 The Guinness Book of World Records recognizes the highest altitude attained via cluster ballooning to be that achieved by Mike Howard (UK) and Steve Davis (USA), who on August 4, 2001, over Los Lunas, NM, USA, used 400 helium balloons to reach a height of over 18,300 feet (5,600 m). Larry Walters is estimated to have reached 16,000 feet (4,900 m) in 1982. His record is not recognized, however, because he did not carry a proper altimeter.
 Yoshikazu Suzuki departed from Lake Biwa in Japan on 23 November 1992 with 23 helium balloons.
 John Ninomiya's flights have been featured on The Science Channel, The History Channel, TechTV, TLC, and MTV.
Like Walters, Couch had a BB gun on hand to shoot the balloons in order to initiate descent. After the flight, he developed a way to release helium from the balloons, allowing for a more controlled descent. During a second flight on July 5, 2008, Couch realized his goal of interstate travel when he landed safely in western Idaho. The trip totaled  and took 9 hours and 12 minutes.
 On January 13, 2008, the Brazilian Roman Catholic priest and human-rights defender Adelir Antonio de Carli lifted off from Ampére, Brazil, suspended under 600 helium-filled party balloons, and reached an altitude of  before landing safely in Argentina. Not having checked the weather forecast, he got caught in a storm. He had a GPS but did not know how to operate it. He was last heard on the radio eight hours after liftoff approaching the water after flying off the coast, unable to give his position, and crashed in the Atlantic Ocean; the lower half of his body was found by the Brazilian Navy near an offshore oil platform on July 4, 2008. 
 On May 28, 2010, the American adventurer Jonathan Trappe crossed the English Channel by cluster balloon, departing near Challock, England, and crossing over the White Cliffs of Dover at St. Margarets Bay. He made landfall again over Dunkirk, France, and then tracked inland, landing in a farmer's cabbage patch in France. Trappe continued to experiment in cluster ballooning flights. In 2011 he replicated the Up house for a National Geographic television program. In September 2013, he tried to cross the Atlantic, but after taking off in Maine he landed in Canada after being unable to control his balloon.
 On June 8, 2013, Joe Barbera, of La Center, WA launched a lawn chair with cluster balloons and recorded a new altitude record of 21,194 feet (6,460 m). This is a pending world record being considered by Guinness Book of World Records.
 On July 6, 2015, Daniel Boria of Calgary, Canada, tied about 100 helium balloons to a garden chair and flew over his city in a publicity stunt. He escaped his balloon pod by cutting himself loose and deploying his parachute.
 On October 20, 2017, Tom Morgan of Bristol, England, reached heights of 8,000 ft (2,438 m) using 100 color helium balloons and has flown 25 km (15.5 miles) over South Africa.
 On September 2, 2020, David Blaine reached  via helium-filled balloons, suspended by harness attached to a cable routed through his sleeve to appear as if holding the balloons by one hand. He had all necessary licenses and permissions, carried an oxygen supply, ADS-B transponder, and remote control of ballast and balloon-popping squibs. The balloon was then remotely piloted by the ground team to a safe landing.

See also
 Balloon boy hoax
 Jetpack man, alleged unauthorized aerial vehicle and possible balloon in 2020s California
 Danny Deckchair (2003 film)
 Up (2009 film)
 Wan Hu

References

External links

Newsreel of the event
Check-Six.com: Larry Walters – "Lawn Chair Pilot", longer detail about Walters's flight

Aviation accidents and incidents in the United States in 1982
July 1982 events
1982 in California
San Pedro, Los Angeles
History of Long Beach, California
Los Angeles International Airport
Chairs
Homebuilt aircraft